is a railway station in the city of Tokoname, Aichi, Japan, owned by Central Japan International Airport Line Company, Ltd. and leased to the private railway operator Meitetsu. The station serves Chūbu Centrair International Airport by a short walkway connecting the station concourse with the airport terminal building.

Lines

Station layout
Central Japan International Airport Station has two elevated bay platforms serving three tracks, one is for μSky limited express trains and the other two are for commuter trains, with the station building underneath. The station has automated ticket machines, Manaca automated turnstiles and it is staffed.

Platforms

Adjacent stations

Station history
Central Japan International Airport Station began operations on October 16, 2004, but initially only for workers at the airport site. It was opened officially to the general public on January 29, 2005, in advance of the opening of the airport in February. On May 23, 2005, a second platform was completed.

Passenger statistics
In fiscal 2016, the station was used by an average of 24,485 passengers daily (boarding passengers only).

Surrounding area
Chūbu Centrair International Airport

See also
 List of Railway Stations in Japan

References

External links

 Official web page 

Railway stations in Japan opened in 2004
Railway stations in Aichi Prefecture
Stations of Nagoya Railroad
Airport railway stations in Japan
Tokoname